Stanislav Yuriyovych Sorokin (born 3 May 2000) is a professional Ukrainian football midfielder who plays for lithuanian Dainava Club.

Career
Sorokin is a product of the FC Dynamo Kyiv Youth Sportive School system and competed for this team in the Ukrainian Youth Football League.

In July 2019 he joined the newly promoted Ukrainian Premier League side FC Kolos Kovalivka and made his debut for its in the away losing match against FC Oleksandriya on 14 March 2020 in the Ukrainian Premier League as a main-squad player.

References

External links
 
 

2000 births
Living people
Footballers from Kyiv
Ukrainian footballers
FC Kolos Kovalivka players
FC Kremin Kremenchuk players
FC Lviv players
FC Shevardeni-1906 Tbilisi players
Ukrainian Premier League players
Ukrainian First League players
Ukrainian expatriate footballers
Expatriate footballers in Georgia (country)
Ukrainian expatriate sportspeople in Georgia (country)

Association football midfielders
Ukraine youth international footballers